Introduction to Quantum Mechanics, often called Griffiths, is an introductory textbook on quantum mechanics by David J. Griffiths. The book is considered a standard undergraduate textbook in the subject. Originally published by Pearson Education in 1995 with a second edition in 2005, Cambridge University Press (CUP) reprinted the second edition in 2017. In 2018, CUP released a third edition of the book with Darrell F. Schroeter as co-author; this edition is known as Griffiths and Schroeter.

Content (3rd edition)
 Part I: Theory
 Chapter 1: The Wave Function
 Chapter 2: Time-independent Schrödinger Equation
 Chapter 3: Formalism
 Chapter 4: Quantum Mechanics in Three Dimensions
 Chapter 5: Identical Particles
 Chapter 6: Symmetries and Conservation Laws
 Part II: Applications
 Chapter 7: Time-independent Perturbation Theory
 Chapter 8: The Variational Principle
 Chapter 9: The WKB Approximation
 Chapter 10: Scattering
 Chapter 11: Quantum Dynamics
 Chapter 12: Afterword
 Appendix: Linear Algebra
 Index

Reception 
The book was reviewed by John R. Taylor, among others. It has also been recommended in other, more advanced, textbooks on the subject.

According to physicists Yoni Kahn of Princeton University and Adam Anderson of the Fermi National Accelerator Laboratory, Griffiths' Quantum Mechanics covers all materials needed for questions on quantum mechanics and atomic physics in the Physics Graduate Record Examinations (Physics GRE).

Publication history

See also 

 Introduction to Electrodynamics by the same author
 List of textbooks in electromagnetism
 List of textbooks on classical mechanics and quantum mechanics

References 

Physics textbooks
Quantum mechanics
1995 non-fiction books
2005 non-fiction books
2018 non-fiction books
Prentice Hall books
Cambridge University Press books
Undergraduate education